Each team's roster consisted of at least 15 skaters (forwards, and defencemen) and 2 goaltenders, and at most 20 skaters and 3 goaltenders. All eight participating nations, through the confirmation of their respective national associations, had to submit a roster by the first IIHF directorate.

Group A

Canada
A 32-player roster was announced on 21 January 2016. The final squad was revealed on 29 February 2016.

Head coach: Laura Schuler

Finland
The roster was announced on 10 March 2016.

Head coach: Pasi Mustonen

Russia
A 32-player roster was announced on 4 March 2016. The final squad was revealed on 22 March 2016.

Head coach: Mikhail Chekanov

United States
The roster was announced on 24 February 2016.

Head coach: Ken Klee

Group B

Czech Republic
Head coach: Jiří Vozák

Japan
The roster was announced on 18 February 2016.

Head coach: Yoshifumi Fujisawa

Sweden
The roster was announced on 15 March 2016.

Head coach: Leif Boork

Switzerland
The roster was announced on 2 March 2016.

Head coach: Daniela Diaz

References

rosters
IIHF Women's World Championship rosters